The 2017 EBSA European Snooker Championship was an amateur snooker tournament that took place from 13 February to 19 March 2017 in Nicosia, Cyprus. It was the 26th edition of the EBSA European Snooker Championships and also doubles as a qualification event for the World Snooker Tour.

The tournament was won by 28th seed Chris Totten who defeated Estonia's Andres Petrov 7–3 in the final. As a result, Totten was given a two-year card on the professional World Snooker Tour for the 2017/2018 and 2018/2019 seasons.

Results

Round 1
Best of 7 frames

Round 2
Best of 7 frames

References

2017 in snooker
Snooker amateur tournaments
Sport in Nicosia
2017 in Cypriot sport
International sports competitions hosted by Cyprus
EBSA European Snooker Championship